Ouria (in Spanish, Ouría) is one of four parishes (administrative divisions) in Taramundi, a municipality within the province and autonomous community of Asturias, in northern Spain.

Villages and hamlets
The place names are in Eonavian. In brackets is shown the name in Spanish.
 O Castro (El Castro) 
 Chaudeleiras (Chao de Leiras)
 Fabal 
 A Lamisqueira (Lamisqueira) 
 Ouria (Ouría)
 As Tingas (Tingas) 
 Villarede

References

Parishes in Taramundi